Takane may refer to:

Places
Takane, Yamanashi, a town in Yamanashi Prefecture, Japan
Takane, Gifu, a town in Gifu, Japan
Takane Dam and Takane No.2 Dam, dams in Gifu Prefecture, Japan

People
Fubuki Takane (born 1965), Japanese actress
Martha Takane, Mexican mathematician
Yūga Takane, Japanese voice actor and singer

Media
Takane and Hana, Japanese shōjo manga series
Takane no Hana, Japanese manga series
Takane no Ringo, single by NMB48
Hibiki Takane, fictional character in video game The Last Blade

Other
9041 Takane, asteroid, named after the town in Yamanashi